The London 1899 chess tournament was a chess tournament held in London. Players of the tournament included old champion Wilhelm Steinitz and Emanuel Lasker, the latter of which won the tournament.

The organizing committee was headed by Sir George Newnes, with Herbert William Trenchard occupying the role of treasurer.

Many top players at the time were invited, with many being the champion of their country. Refusals came from Siegbert Tarrasch and Rudolf Charousek (illness), and Amos Burn had to withdraw on the opening day. Fifteen participants played double rounds from 30 May to 10 July 1899, except for Richard Teichmann. He withdrew after round 4 due to an eye infection.

Lasker finished 4½ points ahead of the group finished tied for second (Janowski, Maroczy, Pillsbury), and was one of the most dominant performances in a chess tournament at the time, and London 1899 is one of many Lasker victories along with St. Petersburg 1896, Paris 1900, St. Petersburg 1914 and New York 1924.

The Premier tournament
The results and standings:

{|class="wikitable"
! # !! Player !! 1 !! 2 !! 3 !! 4 !! 5 !! 6 !! 7 !! 8 !! 9 !! 10 !! 11 !! 12 !! 13 !! 14 !! 15 !! Total
|-
|1 ||  ||xx 	||½ 1	||½ 1	||1 ½	||½ 1	||0 1	||1 1	||1 1	||1 ½	||½ 1	||1 ½	||1 1	||1 1	||1 1	||+ +	||23½
|-
|2–4 || ||½ 0	||xx	||½ ½	||1 0	||½ ½	||½ 1	||0 1	||½ 1	||1 0	||½ 1	||1 1	||½ 1	||1 ½	||1 1	||+ +	||19
|-
|2–4 ||  ||½ 0	||½ ½	||xx	||0 1	||½ 1	||0 0	||1 0	||½ ½	||1 1	||1 1	||1 1	||1 1	||1 ½	||1 1	||½ +	||19
|-
|2–4 ||  ||0 ½	||0 1	||1 0	||xx	||1 1	||1 ½	||1 1	||½ 1	||0 0	||1 0	||1 1	||1 1	||0 1	||1 ½	||+ +	||19
|-
|5 ||  ||½ 0	||½ ½	||½ 0	||0 0	||xx 	||1 ½	||1 0	||½ 1	||½ 1	||1 1	||0 ½	||1 1	||1 1	||1 1	||+ +	||18
|-
|6 ||  ||1 0	||½ 0	||1 1	||0 ½	||0 ½	||xx 	||½ 0	||0 1	||1 ½	||1 0	||0 1	||1 ½	||1 1	||1 1	||½ +	||16½
|-
|7 ||  ||0 0	||1 0	||0 1	||0 0	||0 1	||½ 1	||xx 	||1 ½	||1 ½	||½ 1	||0 1	||1 0	||1 1	||1 0	||1 +	||16
|-
|8 ||  ||0 0	||½ 0	||½ ½	||½ 0	||½ 0	||1 0	||0 ½	||xx 	||0 ½	||1 ½	||0 ½	||1 1	||1 1	||0 1	||+ +	||13½
|-
|9 ||  ||	0 ½ ||0 1 ||0 0	 ||1 1	||½ 0	||0 ½	||0 ½	||1 ½	||xx 	||0 1	||0 0	||0 0	||1 1	||½ 1	||+ +	||13
|-
|10–11 ||  ||½ 0	||½ 0	||0 0	||0 1	||0 0	||0 1	||½ 0	||0 ½	||1 0	||xx 	||1 ½	||½ 0	||½ 1	||1 1	||+ +	||12½
|-
|10–11 ||  ||	0 ½	||0 0	||0 0	||0 0	||1 ½	||1 0	||1 0	||1 ½	||1 1	||0 ½	||xx 	||1 ½	||1 0	||0 0	||+ +	||12½
|-
|12 || 	 ||0 0	||½ 0	||0 0	||0 0	||0 0	||0 ½	||0 1	||0 0	||1 1	||½ 1	||0 ½	||xx 	||½ 1	||½ ½	||+ +	||10½
|-
|13 || 	 ||0 0	||0 ½	||0 ½	||1 0	||0 0	||0 0	||0 0	||0 0	||0 0	||½ 0	||0 1	||½ 0	||xx 	||1 1	||+ +	||8
|-
|14 || 	 ||0 0	||0 0	||0 0	||0 ½	||0 0	||0 0	||0 1	||1 0	||½ 0	||0 0	||1 1	||½ ½	||0 0	||xx 	||0 +	||7
|-
|15 || 	 ||- - ||- -	||½ -	||- -	||- -	||½ -	||0 -	||- -	||- -	||- -	||- -	||- -	||- -	||1 -	||xx 	||2
|}

An amount of £1020 for prizes and consolation money was distributed on 11 July 1899. Lasker got £250 and a gold medal. Steinitz won no prize for the first time in his career.

The Minor tournament
There was a second section in the tournament, which was won by Frank James Marshall with 8½ out of 11. Georg Marco and Jacques Mieses were the most experienced opponents.
The  results and standings:

{|class="wikitable"
! # !! Player !! 1 !! 2 !! 3 !! 4 !! 5 !! 6 !! 7 !! 8 !! 9 !! 10 !! 11 !! 12 !! Total
|-
|1 ||  ||x ||½ ||0 ||1 ||½ ||1 ||1 ||½ ||1 ||1 ||1 ||1 || 8½
|-
|2–3 ||  || ½ ||x ||½ ||½ ||½ ||1 ||1 ||1 ||1 ||½ ||½ ||1  ||8
|-
|2–3 ||  ||1 ||½ ||x ||½ ||½ ||½ ||½ ||½ ||1 ||1 ||1 ||1 || 8
|-
|4–5 ||  ||0 ||½ ||½ ||x ||1 ||0 ||1 ||1 ||1 ||1 ||½ ||1 || 7½
|-
|4–5 ||  ||½ ||½ ||½ ||0 ||x ||0 ||1 ||1 ||1 ||1 ||1 ||1 || 7½
|-
|6–7 ||  ||0 ||0 ||½ ||1 ||1 ||x ||0 ||0 ||1 ||1 ||0 ||1 || 5½
|-
|6–7 ||  ||0 ||0 ||½ ||0 ||0 ||1 ||x ||0 ||1 ||1 ||1 ||1 || 5½
|-
|8 ||  /   ? ||½ ||0 ||½ ||0 ||0 ||1 ||1 ||x ||0 ||1 ||0 ||1  ||5
|-
|9–10 ||  ||0 ||0 ||0 ||0 ||0 ||0 ||0 ||1 ||x ||½ ||1 ||1 || 3½
|-
|9–10 ||  ||0 ||½ ||0 ||½ ||0 ||1 ||0 ||1 ||½ ||x ||0 ||0 || 3½
|-
|11 ||  ||0 ||½ ||0 ||0 ||0 ||0 ||0 ||0 ||½ ||1 ||x ||1 || 3
|-
|12 ||  ||0 ||0 ||0 ||0 ||0 ||0 ||0 ||0 ||0 ||0 ||0 ||x || 0
|}

See also
London 1851 chess tournament
London 1862 chess tournament
London 1883 chess tournament

References

Chess competitions
1899 in chess
Chess
Chess in London
May 1899 sports events
June 1899 sports events
July 1899 sports events